Gregory Raymond Kelly (born December 17, 1968) is an American conservative television anchor, television host, and retired lieutenant colonel in the United States Marine Corps Reserve. He is the host of Greg Kelly Reports, on Newsmax TV. He was previously the co-host of Good Day New York on Fox 5 NY WNYW, with Rosanna Scotto, from 2008 to 2017.

Background, education, and military career
Kelly is a native of Garden City, New York. His father is former New York City Police Commissioner, Raymond W. Kelly. He graduated from Fordham University with a B.A. in political science. While attending Fordham, Kelly worked at WFUV as an on-air reporter. After graduating from Fordham, Kelly became an officer in the U.S. Marine Corps Reserves. During his tour of active duty military service between 1991 and 2000 he was an AV-8B Harrier jump jet pilot assigned to Marine Attack Squadron 211, the "Wake Island Avengers". While on duty Kelly amassed 158 aircraft carrier landings and flew over Iraq in Operation Southern Watch, enforcing the United Nations imposed No-Fly Zone.

Media career
In the late 1990s, Kelly was an anchor for the morning news program at ABC affiliate WIVT-TV in Binghamton, New York. Later, Kelly was a political reporter for NY1 in New York City. Kelly joined Fox News in 2002.

During the 2003 U.S. invasion of Iraq, Kelly was an embedded reporter with the United States Army's 3rd Infantry Division, 2nd Brigade. He received a minor shrapnel wound to the face when a mortar round exploded near him. Kelly was the first television journalist to broadcast live pictures of U.S. military forces reaching the presidential palace in Baghdad.

Kelly was a host of Good Day New York from 2008 through June 2012 when he moved to the 6 and 10 PM news on Fox 5 and was replaced by Dave Price. In January 2013, Price announced his departure, and Kelly was moved back to Good Day New York. Kelly left Good Day New York in September 2017, replaced by former WABC-TV anchor Lori Stokes.

In January 2020, Kelly joined Newsmax TV, where he hosts Greg Kelly Reports in the 7 pm slot.

In June 2021, Kelly generated controversy by tweeting, and then deleting, a statement that "Military life had its Perks, but it was also a major pain. I will tell you what took 'the sting out of it'—that when I was flying around the Pacific Ocean off of ships, I knew there was a Secretary of Defense who was white, just like me! Made a big difference with 'morale'".

In March 2021, Kelly joined WABC radio in New York City, to host in daytime.

Personal life
Kelly is married to Judith Grey, a creative director in advertising. They were married on November 12, 2017, at New York's University Club.

In January–February 2012 Kelly was investigated by the Manhattan District Attorney's office upon an accusation of rape. Kelly was never arrested nor charged with a crime.  After an investigation, the District Attorney issued a letter stating that under NY state criminal law, the incident did not constitute a crime. Kelly returned to work February 13, 2012. On June 9, 2014, Kelly's accuser spoke publicly for the first time about her 2012 allegations against Kelly.

References

External links
 

1968 births
Living people
People from Garden City, New York
Aviators from New York (state)
American television reporters and correspondents
United States Naval Aviators
United States Marine Corps officers
United States Marine Corps reservists
Fordham University alumni
21st-century American journalists
Conservatism in the United States
20th-century American journalists
American male journalists
Newsmax TV people
WFUV people
American media critics
Critics of Black Lives Matter